The High Commissioner of the United Kingdom of Great Britain and Northern Ireland to Malaysia is the head of United Kingdom's diplomatic mission to Malaysia. The position has the rank and status of an Ambassador Extraordinary and Plenipotentiary and is based in the High Commission of the United Kingdom, Kuala Lumpur.

Prior to its separation and independence from the British Empire in 1957, Malaya was ruled by governors also termed "High Commissioners".

List of heads of mission

High Commissioner to Malaya 

1957–1963: Sir Geofroy Tory

High Commissioners to Malaysia 

1963–1966: Antony Head, 1st Viscount Head  
1966–1971: Sir Michael Walker  
1971–1974: Sir John Johnston  
1974–1977: Sir Eric Norris  
1977–1981: Sir Donald Hawley  
1981–1983: Sir William Bentley  
1983–1986: David Gillmore
1986–1992: Sir Nicholas Spreckley  
1992–1994: Duncan Slater  
1994–1998: Sir David Moss  
1998–2001: Sir Graham Fry  
2001–2006: Bruce Cleghorn  
2006–2010: Boyd McCleary  
2010–2014: Simon Featherstone
2014-2019: Victoria Treadell  

2019–: Charles Hay

See also
 Malaysia–United Kingdom relations

References

External links
UK and Malaysia, gov.uk

Malaysia
 
Malaysia and the Commonwealth of Nations
United Kingdom and the Commonwealth of Nations
United Kingdom